Internet Freedom Foundation (IFF) is an Indian non-governmental organisation that conducts advocacy on digital rights and liberties, based in New Delhi. IFF files petitions and undertakes advocacy campaigns to defend online freedom, privacy, net neutrality, and innovation.

Background

The Internet Freedom Foundation was formed out of the SaveTheInternet.in campaign which was a volunteer-driven campaign. The campaign in support of net neutrality garnered over 1.2 million signatures and led the TRAI to prohibit discriminatory practices by companies on the internet. To enable structured engagement, the volunteers of the SaveTheInternet.in campaign established IFF to work on issues of privacy, free speech, net neutrality, and innovation on the internet.

Activities

IFF undertakes advocacy campaigns against blocking of websites, technology related interference in elections, free speech violations, internet censorship, and defends encryption.

Projects

Zombie Tracker
Zombie Tracker is a tool built by IFF in partnership with Civic Data labs to track cases under Section 66A as a "data-driven evidence-based solution" to highlight the continued use of Section 66A, which was struck down by the Supreme Court of India in Shreya Singhal v. Union of India.

Project Panoptic
Project Panoptic tracks the development and implementation of facial recognition technology projects in India with an aim to increase transparency and accountability around the use of Facial recognition technology in India. The tracker was built by IFF along with volunteers from Datakind and Frappe. As of November 2021,  Project Panoptic has been tracking 78 FRT projects across the country, with an estimated cost of 9.6 billion rupees.

IFF's Project Panoptic along with Amnesty International and Article 19, launched the Hyderabad leg of BanTheScan campaign. Hyderabad is one of the most surveilled cities in the world, with 600,000 cameras monitoring its citizens all the time.

Digital Patrakar Defence Clinic
Digital Patrakar Defense Clinic ( DPDC) offers pro-bono legal assistance and representation to Indian journalists, cartoonists, bloggers, and any individuals who use the medium of the internet to report on daily affairs.

Campaigns and Legislative Work

In March 2017, IFF drafted a law to reform India's defamation law which was introduced in Lok Sabha as a Private Member's Bill by Tathagata Satpathy. The bill garnered more than 2000 signatures and 54 organisational supporters, including India's largest publishing houses.

In April 2017, IFF launched a campaign against internet shutdowns in India called KeepUsOnline. They petitioned the Prime Minister and the Union Minister for Electronics and Information Technology to introduce credible measures to stop arbitrary internet shutdowns in India.

Save Our Privacy
Launched in 2018, SaveOurPrivacy is a public initiative launched by a collective of 35 organizations including IFF, which put across a model draft law called "Indian Privacy Code, 2018". The code has seven core principles, one of which calls for surveillance reform. It advocates for a law that limits mass or 'dragnet' surveillance, and lays down clear rules governing individual surveillance. It also seeks the strengthening and protection of the right to information.
After going through multiple revisions, the draft was filed as a private member's bill in the parliament, twice. The collective creates resources for public awareness and continuously engages with government representatives.

Litigation

IFF has petitioned or intervened in cases relating to Whatsapp Privacy, the Right to be Forgotten, CCTV surveillance, PUBG bans, Section 66A arrests, Aadhaar Social-Media Linking.

Publications

IFF publishes open working papers from fellows. The first research paper by Nakul Nayak studied the law and impact of internet shutdowns in India, and the second research paper by Apar Gupta and Abhinav Sekhri called attention to the continued use of Section 66A of the IT Act, despite the Supreme Court striking it down.

Support

IFF is a donor-driven organisation with recurring monthly payment subscriptions for members. It is also organisationally supported by Indian startups such as Zerodha, Sharechat (2019-2020), OML, Devfolio and Doosra. In 2021 IFF received a grant from UNESCO. It also publishes monthly transparency reports.

See also 

 Article 19
 Digital rights
 Censorship in India
 European Digital Rights (EDRi)
 Electronic Frontier Canada
 Electronic Frontiers Australia
 Electronic Privacy Information Center
 Freedom of information
 Internet censorship
 Internet censorship in India
 Internet in India
 Privacy International
 People's Union for Civil Liberties
 Telecom Regulatory Authority of India

References

External links
 

2016 establishments in India
Computer law organizations
Digital rights organizations